Francis "Frank" Murphy (21 May 1947 – 5 January 2017) was an Irish athlete, who specialised in middle-distance running. He earned a silver medal by finishing in second place in the 1500 metres event at the 1969 European Athletics Championships.  He competed at the Summer Olympics in 1968 and 1972. He was also a 1500 m runner-up to Henryk Szordykowski at the 1970 European Athletics Indoor Championships. He died on 5 January 2017 at the age of 69.

References

External links
 Profile from Athletics Ireland

1947 births
2017 deaths
Sportspeople from Dublin (city)
Irish male middle-distance runners
Olympic athletes of Ireland
Athletes (track and field) at the 1968 Summer Olympics
Athletes (track and field) at the 1972 Summer Olympics
European Athletics Championships medalists